General elections were held in Kenya on 14 October 1974. At the time, the country was a de facto one-party state with the Kenya African National Union being the sole party to participate in the election. 740 KANU candidates stood for the 158 National Assembly seats, with 88 incumbents (including four ministers) defeated. Voter turnout was 56.5%. Although the post of President of Kenya was due to be elected at the same time as the National Assembly, Jomo Kenyatta was the sole candidate and was automatically elected without a vote being held. Following the election, a further 12 members were appointed by President Kenyatta.

Results

References

Elections in Kenya
One-party elections
1974 in Kenya
Kenya
National Assembly (Kenya)
Election and referendum articles with incomplete results